Linda Geiser (born 13 May 1935) is a Swiss film and television actress best known for her role in the Swiss TV series Lüthi und Blanc as Johanna Blanc.

Career
Having attended acting school  at the University of the Arts Bern and learned English in Berne, Geiser moved to America in 1961 and lived in New York City, where she established herself in theatre. She studied acting at HB Studio. In 1964, she made a controversial appearance in Sidney Lumet's The Pawnbroker by playing a scene in which she fully exposed her breasts. At the time, this contravened the Motion Picture Production Code and was one of the earliest instances of a nude scene in a mainstream film.

Filmography

References

External links
 
 Ausführliche Infos und Pressestimmen

1935 births
Swiss film actresses
Swiss television actresses
Living people
People from Bern
20th-century Swiss actresses
21st-century Swiss actresses